Mark Pae (1926–2013) was an Anglican bishop in the 20th century.

Pae was born in 1926 and educated at Nashotah House, Wisconsin and ordained deacon in 1954 and priest in 1956. He was a priest in the Diocese of Korea to 1965 when the diocese was divided. He then worked in the new Taejon diocese as Archdeacon of Ch'ungch'ong and was appointed its bishop in 1974. He was consecrated a bishop on 1 June 1974 by Paul Cheon-hwan Lee, Bishop of Seoul, at Seoul Anglican Cathedral. His son is a priest in Great Neck, New York.

Notes

1926 births
2013 deaths
Nashotah House alumni
Anglican archdeacons in South Korea
Anglican bishops of Daejeon
South Korean Anglicans